Canagliflozin/metformin, sold under the brand name Vokanamet among others, is a fixed-dose combination anti-diabetic medication used for the treatment of type 2 diabetes. It is used in combination with diet and exercise. It is taken by mouth.

The most common side effects include hypoglycemia (low blood glucose levels) when used in combination with insulin or a sulphonylurea and vulvovaginal candidiasis (thrush, a fungal infection of the female genital area caused by Candida).

Canagliflozin/metformin was approved for medical use in the European Union in April 2014, and for use in the United States in August 2014.

Medical uses 
Canagliflozin/metformin is indicated in adults aged 18 years of age and older with type 2 diabetes as an adjunct to diet and exercise to improve glycemic control.

Adverse effects 

To lessen the risk of developing ketoacidosis (a serious condition in which the body produces high levels of blood acids called ketones) after surgery, the FDA approved changes to the prescribing information for SGLT2 inhibitor diabetes medicines to recommend they be stopped temporarily before scheduled surgery. Canagliflozin, dapagliflozin, and empagliflozin should each be stopped at least three days before, and ertugliflozin should be stopped at least four days before scheduled surgery.

Symptoms of ketoacidosis include nausea, vomiting, abdominal pain, tiredness, and trouble breathing.

References

Further reading

External links
 
 
 
 
 
 
 

Anti-diabetic drugs
Biguanides
Combination drugs
Fluoroarenes
Glucosides
Guanidines
SGLT2 inhibitors
Thiophenes